The Rorabaugh House is historic Romanesque house located on Guilford Road in Jessup, Maryland.

The structure was built by William P. Cresson in period after Howard County was split off from Anne Arundel County and slavery was still practiced. Micheal Fitzsimmons purchased the property on 5 October 1863 for $4,600. The two story L-Shaped wood-framed house sat on property subdivided down to 4.5 acres. The adjoining lots and structures created for daughters of the heirs were destroyed to create Maryland Route 32.

The house was once owned by Maryland Maryland House of Delegates and politician William C. Bevan.  The house was raised between 1984 and 1988.

See also
Mt. Moriah Lodge No. 7

References

Jessup, Maryland
Houses in Howard County, Maryland
Houses completed in 1854